= Spin Ghundi railway station =

Railway station in Pakistan

General information
- Coordinates: 30.696663°N 66.664379°E
- Owner: Ministry of Railways

Other information
- Station code: SPH

History
- Former names: Great Indian Peninsula Railway
Location

Spin Ghundi railway station (Urdu: سپین گھونڈی ریلوے اسٹیشن) is located in Pakistan.

== See also ==
- List of railway stations in Pakistan
- Pakistan Railways
